Richard Benson may refer to:

 Richard Benson (MP), English Member of Parliament for Ludlow, 1604
 Richard Meux Benson (1824–1915), priest in the Church of England
 Richard Benson (photographer) (1943–2017), American photographer
 Richard Benson (musician) (1955–2022), English-Italian musician
 Rich Benson (born 1967), American tennis player
 Avenger (pulp-magazine character) or Richard Henry Benson

See also
Dick Benson (disambiguation)